Georg Mascetti (9 April 1930 – 1 August 1982) was a German swimmer. He competed in the men's 400 metre freestyle at the 1952 Summer Olympics representing Saar.

References

1930 births
1982 deaths
German male swimmers
Olympic swimmers of Saar
Swimmers at the 1952 Summer Olympics
Sportspeople from Saarbrücken
German male freestyle swimmers
20th-century German people